The Belmont was an electric car manufactured in Wyandotte, Michigan, by the Belmont Electric Auto Company in 1916.  They produced four- and six-seater electrical limousines, along with other commercial electric vehicles.

References
 
 EV History: econogics.com

Electric vehicles introduced in the 20th century
Cars introduced in 1916
Motor vehicle manufacturers based in Michigan
Defunct motor vehicle manufacturers of the United States
Defunct companies based in Michigan